Deanna Kirk is an American jazz singer-songwriter based in New York City.

Career
Kirk has released one live jazz album, Live at Deanna's, as well as a studio album, Marianna Trench, which featured original songs and covers of songs by Leonard Cohen and Sandy Denny.  Billboard magazine featured her on their front page as the flagship artist at Blackbird Recording Company. She was featured in People magazine, the New York Times, Time Out, and New York magazine.

Kirk wrote and recorded a second studio album, Where Are You Now for Blackbird/Elektra. She toured North America with Jane Siberry.

She has written and recorded songs for film and television soundtracks. Her music has been featured in the television shows as Felicity and Hyperion Bay and on the movie soundtracks Down to You (2000) and Me Myself I (2000).

Personal life

Kirk was born in Manhattan and grew up in Freeport, Long Island. Her father, David, is a retired Navy Captain and architect and her mother, Anna Maria, teaches voice and performs around the New York region. Kirk is a concert-level pianist and her two sisters are both multi-instrumentalists.

Discography 
 Live at Deanna's (Atlantic, 1994) 
 Marianna Trench (Blackbird, 1996)
 Where Are You Now? (Blackbird, 1997)
 Beautyway (Deanna Kirk, 2002)
 Lost in Languid Love Songs (Deanna Kirk, 2013)

References

External links 
 

Living people
Year of birth missing (living people)
American women jazz singers
American jazz singers
21st-century American women